Colour sorters or color sorters (sometimes called optical sorters, digital sorters, or electronic colour sorters) are machines used on the production lines in bulk food processing and other industries. They separate items by their colours, detecting the colours of things that pass before them, and use mechanical or pneumatic ejection devices to divert items whose colours do not fall within the acceptable range or which are desired to form a separate group from the rest.

Grain (agricultural products) industry
Colour sorters are mostly used in sorting grain (agricultural products). The rice sorting industry is the first big market. The rice sorting technology is according to the color differences of rice (husked paddy) materials, using a high-resolution CCD optical sensor to separate stones, black rice, etc. It is the final step after polishing rice with a rice polisher. The second sorting market is in use for coarse cereals, such as wheat, corn, peanut, different kinds of beans, sesame seeds, etc.  This can also include grains, seeds, cereals, pulses, coffee, and nuts.  The color sorters also can be used to remove harmful plastics and metals.

Optical Color Sorters are among the newest technology in seed and grain processing. This equipment separates particles based on color and is often used at or near the end of the processing line, after mechanical separations, to remove impurities of similar size and density.

Machines are available from a quarter to ten chutes wide. Technology range includes a simple monochromatic version, to bichromatic, NIR, InGaAs, RGB Full Color, and shape sizing.

Color sorting is necessary to ensure the best purity of bulk products, as well as ensuring that the strictest food hygiene and health requirements of end-products are met.

Food industry
Colour sorters are used for the food processing industry, such as coffee, nuts, and oil crops. The goal is the separation of items that are discoloured, toxic (such as ergot), not as ripe as required, or still with hull after dehulling such as sunflower seeds.. Compared with manual sorting, machines save labor and time, have higher efficiency, and have lower processing costs. Throughputs have increased with the use of new CCD technologies and are now up to 100 t/h.

Diamond and mining industry
Colour sorters are also used in the diamond industry. The transparency of the diamond is measured by the colour sorter and used as a measurement of its purity, and the diamonds are mechanically sorted accordingly.  This has an advantage over X-ray fluorescence methods of robotically detecting purity, since purer diamonds are less likely to fluoresce.

In the mining sorting industry, colour sorting is also called sensor-based sorting technology. Optical colour sorters (CCD colour camera) combine X-ray sorting technology and NIR (near infrared spectrometry) to pick out the impurities of ore, minerals, stone and sand products, or separate ore into two or more categories.

Recycling

In the recycling industry, colour sorters are widely used for plastic and glasses color sorting. It can distinguish between colored and colorless PET and colored and colorless HDPE flakes, as well as separate flakes by colour before re-granulation. For example, a colour sorter can remove non-food grade PET from recovering food grade.For glass recycling, a colour sorter can remove various contaminants(ceramic, stones, porcelain, metals, etc.）contained in glass fragments. After that glass can be reused as secondary raw material.

Usually, a belt type of colour sorter is used for recycling sorting. Compared with the chute colour sorter, the belt-type colour sorter can handle a variety of irregular-shaped materials. Its parallel belt help stabilizes the material and avoids many problems such as the recognition problem (the material cannot be recognized by the colour sorter due to its rolling).

Types
Sorters can be divided into chute-type and belt-type colour sorters. 

Belt-type colour sorters break a smaller percentage of the material (important for nuts), and the product stays relatively static during the transport process as it moves horizontally on the belt. In the chute type, material slides on the chute because of gravity, causing collision, friction, and larger vertical movements, thus worsening the ratio of broken material. The belt structure makes the transmission smooth and stable without bouncing of material.

Chute-type colour sorters are commonly used for food, as prices are lower, capacities are higher, and products can be seen more easily from both sides, which is important when a dehulled grain has hull only on one side. Chute sorters are usually applicable to specific products, as the chute is designed with special channels for this kind of material based on sizes and shapes of the material. For example, 5 mm chutes are used for rice, grain and plastic granules. Flat chutes are right for plastic flakes, such as PET, or milk bottle flakes.

References 

6.Color sorter is being used in the nuts industry for grading nuts and seeds.

Sources

Further reading 
 
 

Industrial machinery